This is the list of original programming currently and formerly broadcast by the Indian television channel, Sony SAB.

Current broadcasts

Former broadcasts

Comedy series

 A Mad House (2005)
 Aadat Se Majboor (2017–2018)
 Aaj Ke Shrimaan Shrimati (2005)
 Abhi Toh Main Jawan Hoon (2003)
 Aflatoon (2001)
 Akting-Akting (2002–2003)
 Ammaji Ki Galli (2011)
 Apna News Aayega (2019–2020)
 Bade Miya Chhote Miya (2003)
 Badi Doooor Se Aaye Hai (2014–2016)
 Bhakharwadi (2019–2020)
 Band Baaja Bandh Darwaza (2019)
 Baavle Utaavle (2019)
 Beechwale - Bapu Dekh Raha Hai (2018–2019)
 Bhaago KK Aaya (2008)
 Bhai Bhaiya Aur Brother (2012)
 Bhootwala Serial (2009)
 Carry on Alia (2019–2020)
 Chandrakant Chiplunkar Seedi Bamba Wala (2014)
 Chalti Ka Naam Gaadi...Let's Go (2015–2016)
 Chamcha in Chief (2005–2006)
 Chidiya Ghar (2011–2017)
 Chintu Chinki Aur Ek Badi Si Love Story (2011–2012)
 Chhupke Chhupke (2014)
 Daddy Samjha Karo (2000–2001)
 Dhaba Junction (2003–2004)
 Dil Deke Dekho (2016–2017)
 Don't Worry Chachu (2011–2012)
 Dr. Madhumati On Duty (2016)
 F.I.R. (2006–2015)
 Full Masti 88.2 (2008)
 Funhit Mein Jaari (2020–2021)
 Gilli  Gilli Gappa (2010–2011)
 Golmaal Hai Bhai Sab Golmaal Hai (2012)
 Gopi Gadha Aur Gupshup (2012)
 The Great Indian Family Drama (2015)
 Gunwale Dulhania Le Jayenge (2009)
 Gupp Chupp (2016)
 Gutur Gu (2010–2014)
 Hansi He Hansi...Mil Toh Lein (2015)
 Hassi Woh Phassi (2003)
 Hansi He Hansi...Mil Toh Lein (2015)
 Hum Aapke Ghar Mein Rehte Hain (2015)
 Hum Aapke Hain In Laws (2013)
 Humse Hai Zamana (2008)
 I Luv My India (2012)
 Jasoos 005 (2008)
 Jaankhilavan Jasoos (2010–2011)
 Jeannie Aur Juju (2012–2014)
 Jijaji Chhat Per Hain (2018–2020)
 Jijaji Chhat Parr Koii Hai (2021)
 Jugni Chali Jalandhar (2008–2010)
 Jo Biwi Se Kare Pyaar (2013)
 Kaatelal & Sons (2020–2021) 
 Khatmal E Ishq (2016–2017)
 Khidki (2016)
 Krishna Kanhaiya (2015)
 Lapataganj (2009–2014)
 Lo Ho Gayi Pooja Iss Ghar Ki (2008–2009)
 Main Kab Saas Banoongi (2008–2009)
 Malegaon Ka Chintu (2011–2014)
 Mangalam Dangalam (2018–2019)
 Maniben.com (2009–2010)
 Masti (2005)
 Mohalla Mohabbat Wala (2008)
 Mrs. & Mr. Sharma Allahabadwale (2010–2011)
 Mrs. Tendulkar (2011)
 My Name Ijj Lakhan (2019)
 Namune (2018)
 Office Office (2001–2004)
 Papad Pol (2010–2011)
 Partners Trouble Ho Gayi Double (2017–2018)
 Platform No. 9 (2005)
 Police Factory (2015–2016)
 Pritam Pyare Aur Woh (2014)
Raamkhilavaan (CM) ‘n’ Family (2002–2003)
 Ring Wrong Ring (2010–2011)
 R. K. Laxman Ki Duniya (2011–2013)
 Rumm Pumm Po (2015)
 Saat Phero Ki Hera Pherie (2018)
 Sab Ka Bheja Fry (2007)
 Sab Kuch Ho Sakta Hai (2005–2006)
 Sabse Bada Rupaiya (2005)
 Saheb Biwi Aur Boss (2015–2016)
 Sahib Biwi Ka Ghulam (2003)
 Sajan Re Jhoot Mat Bolo (2009–2012)
 Sajan Re Phir Jhoot Mat Bolo (2017–2018)
 Shankar Jaikishan 3 in 1 (2017)
 Shree Adi Manav (2008)
 Shrimaan Shrimati Phir Se (2018)
 Shree Sifarishilal (2003–2004)
 Sonu Sweety (2008–2009)
 Super Sisters - Chalega Pyar Ka Jaadu (2018)
 Tenali Rama (2017–2020) 
 Tera Yaar Hoon Main (2020–2022) 
 Thank You Jijaji (2009)
 Tota Weds Maina (2013)
 Trideviyaan (2016–2017)
 Tu Mere Agal Bagal Hai (2014)
 TV, Biwi aur Main (2017)
 Waqt Hamara Hai (2008)
 Woh Teri Bhabhi Hai Pagle (2016)
 Yam Hain Hum (2014–2016)
 Yeh Chanda Kanoon Hai (2009–2010)
 Yes Boss (1999–2009)
 Zabaan Sambhalke (2003–2004)

Drama series

 Aladdin – Naam Toh Suna Hoga (2018–2021)
 Alif Laila (2001–2002)
 Apni Khushian Apne Gham (2001)
 Baal Veer (2012–2016)
 Baalveer Returns (2019–2021)
 Betaal Aur Singhasan Battisi (2015)
 Bhanwar (1999)
 Colonell (2002)
 Dharm Yoddha Garud (2022)
 Dial 100 (2003)
 Doli Leke Ayee Hai (2002–2004)
 Dulhan (2004)
 Four (2007)
Hero – Gayab Mode On (2020–2021)
 Ichhapyaari Naagin (2016–2017)
 Jai Shri Swaminarayan (2002)
 Jersey No. 10 (2007–2008)
 Ji Bhenji (2006)
 Karam (2001)
 Left Right Left (2006–2008)
 Love Story (2007–2008)
 Love Mein Kabhi Kabhi (2003–2004)
 Maddam Sir (2020–2023)
 Peterson Hill (2015)
 Sab Satrangi (2022)
 Sambandh (2001)
 Sati Savitri (2001)
 Satyavadi Raja Harishchandra (2001)
 Search (2002)
 Shubh Laabh - Aapkey Ghar Mein (2021–2022) 
 Twinkle Beauty Parlour Lajpat Nagar (2006)
 Y.A.R.O Ka Tashan (2016–2017)
 Ziddi Dil Maane Na (2021–2022)

Reality/non-scripted programming

 Acting Ki Funshaala (2008)
 Carryy on Shekhar (2003–2004)
 Comedy Ka King Kaun (2008)
 Comedy Superstar (2015)
 Fame X (2006–2007)
 Family Antakshri Baithe Baithe Kya Kare (2014)
 Good Night India (2022)
 India Ke Mast Kalandar (2018)
 Kuch... Diiil Se (2003)
 Kuch Smiles Ho Jayein... With Alia (2020)
 Lo Kal Lo Baat (2005–2006)
 Movers & Shakers (2012)
 Mr. Aur Mrs. Verma Ki Rasoi
 Rukawat Ke Liye Khed Hai (2015)
 Sab Ka Sapna Money Money (2015)
 Sab Khelo Sab Jeeto (2013–2014)
Sab Kuch Ho Sakta Hai (2004)
 Say Na Something Anupam Uncle (2000–2004)
 Swayam (2001–2002)
 Tedhi Baat Shekhar Ke Saath (2009)
 Wah Wah (2008)
 Wah! Wah! Kya Baat Hai! (2012–2013)
 Zimmedar Kaun? (2008)

Hindi dubbed shows

 Alias (2008)
 America's Funniest Home Videos (2008)
 Desperate Housewives (2008)
 Extreme Makeover (2008)
 Home Improvement (2008)
 Lost (2008)
 My Wife and Kids (2008)
 Watchdog (2008)

Animated series
 Asterix the Gaul (2001–2002)
 Turtle Island (2001–2002)

References

Sony SAB
Sony SAB